Kai August Forbath (born September 2, 1987) is a former American football placekicker. He played college football at UCLA and was recognized as an All-American and the best college kicker in the country in 2009. Forbath was signed by the Cowboys as an undrafted free agent in 2011, and has played for Washington, New Orleans Saints, Minnesota Vikings, Jacksonville Jaguars, Dallas Cowboys, New England Patriots, and Los Angeles Rams.

Early years
Forbath was born in Santa Monica, California. He attended Notre Dame High School in Sherman Oaks. During Forbath's last two prep seasons, he converted 26-of-33 field goal attempts and scored 213 total points, with a long field goal of 57 yards. He also forced touchbacks on 150 of 188 kickoffs and made 134-of-135 extra point attempts. Forbath also served as the team's punter and had a punting average of 46 yards that led to him being named to the Los Angeles Times''' All-Star team at punter. Forbath subsequently earned high school All-American recognition by USA Today''. In addition to football, Forbath also played soccer in the West Valley Samba Soccer League (National Premier Soccer League). Following his senior season, Forbath was invited to play in the 2006 U.S. Army All-American Bowl and the CaliFlorida Bowl.

Considered a three-star recruit by Rivals.com, Forbath was listed as the No. 1 placekicker in the nation among the class of 2006.  He picked UCLA over California, Notre Dame, Oregon, among others.

College career

Forbath attended UCLA, where he played for the football team from 2006 to 2010. After redshirting his initial year at UCLA, Forbath made 25 of 30 field goals and all 30 points after touchdowns (PATs) for a team-high 105 points in 2007. He became the first UCLA player to record five field goals of at least 50 yards in a season, including a freshman-best 54-yarder versus Oregon. In his sophomore year, Forbath received first-team All-Pacific-10 honors after making 19 of 22 field goals on the season, including his last 13 straight.

As a junior in 2009, Forbath connected on another three field goals from 50 yards or more and had then made 9-of-12 tries from that distance. Competing with Leigh Tiffin of Alabama and Blair Walsh of Georgia, Forbath was named the winner of the 2009 Lou Groza Award, recognizing the best placekicker in college football.

On September 25, 2010, Forbath kicked two field goals in leading the Bruins to an upset victory over the #7 Texas Longhorns 34–12 in front of a stadium-record 101,437 fans in Austin, Texas. In the previous week, Forbath kicked a 42-yard field goal in the third quarter to give the Bruins a 24–3 lead in the game against then-#23 Houston. UCLA defeated Houston by a score of 31–13. On November 6, 2010, Forbath kicked a game winning 51-yard field goal in the last second of the game to give the Bruins a 17–14 win over Oregon State, and he was named Pac-10 Conference Special Team Player-of-the-Week.

Professional career

Dallas Cowboys
Although he was projected as the second-best kicker in the 2011 NFL Draft, Forbath was not selected in the Draft. Alex Henery ended up being the only kicker selected in the draft that year. On August 2, Forbath was signed by the Dallas Cowboys as an undrafted free agent, but because he had a pre-existing quad injury that did not allow him to practice and that would take a lengthy time to heal, he was immediately placed on the active non-football injury list. At the time, the Cowboys had an open competition for the placekicker job and were covering themselves in case a player did not emerge from the four kickers they had in training camp at one time.

On August 30, he was placed on the Non-Football Injury list, so he would not count towards the first 80-player cut and later towards the 53-player limit. The performance of fellow rookie Dan Bailey made the Cowboys decide to keep Forbath on the NFI list during all of the regular season.

On April 16, 2012, Forbath was waived by the Cowboys, having never participated in a practice with the team.

Tampa Bay Buccaneers
The Tampa Bay Buccaneers claimed Forbath off waivers on April 17, 2012. During the preseason, Forbath made all five field goal attempts, including a successful 55-yard kick.

Washington Redskins
The Washington Redskins signed Forbath on October 9, 2012, replacing Billy Cundiff.  Forbath made his NFL and Washington debut knocking through a 50-yard attempt as his first career NFL field goal in the home game against the Minnesota Vikings in Week 6 on October 14, 2012. His performance was essential in Washington's victory over the Baltimore Ravens in Week 14, where he recorded 48-yard and 49-yard field goals and then converted a game-winning 34-yard field goal in overtime.

On December 23, 2012, in Week 16, Forbath set the NFL record for consecutive field goals to begin a career with 17 in a row, beating Garrett Hartley, who previously held the record at 16. The football was sent to the Pro Football Hall of Fame.

On October 19, 2014, in Week 7, Forbath scored the game-winning field goal in the 19–17 win over the Tennessee Titans. He then was named NFC Special Teams Player of the Week after scoring the overtime winning field goal against the Dallas Cowboys the following week. He would once again score the game-winning field goal in the 27–24 Week 16 win over the Philadelphia Eagles.

Washington offered Forbath a $1,542,000 right of first refusal tender on March 8, 2015, which he signed on April 15, 2015. Forbath was released by the team on September 14, 2015.

Forbath finished his career with Washington as the second-most accurate kicker in team history, converting 87.0 percent of his field goal attempts (60-of-69). His mark of 60 field goals and 91 extra points rank fifth in franchise history.

New Orleans Saints
The New Orleans Saints signed Forbath on October 19, 2015, to replace a struggling Zach Hocker, who was released by the team.

Forbath played in first career game as a member of the Saints in Week 7 against the Indianapolis Colts on October 25, 2015, converting on three-of-four extra point attempts in the 27–21 victory. On November 1, in Week 8, Forbath ended a record-breaking 52–49 shootout against the New York Giants at the Mercedes-Benz Superdome with a 50-yard field goal as time expired. On November 29, in Week 12, Forbath kicked a career-long 57-yard field goal against the Houston Texans, which is the third-longest in team history. On January 3, 2016, Forbath kicked a 30-yard game-winning field goal in the regular season finale in Week 17 against the Atlanta Falcons as time expired, his sixth career game-winner.

On March 10, 2016, the Saints re-signed Forbath.  Throughout the team's 2016 preseason, Forbath competed with Connor Barth, and the Saints ultimately kept Forbath while cutting Barth. However, a few days later, on September 6, the Saints also released Forbath in favor of an undrafted rookie kicker, Wil Lutz, who had gone through training camp with the Baltimore Ravens.

Minnesota Vikings
On November 16, 2016, the Minnesota Vikings signed Forbath to a one-year, $760,000 contract after releasing incumbent kicker Blair Walsh. In Forbath's first game with the Vikings, in Week 11, he converted one field goal and three extra points against the Arizona Cardinals. On December 11, he kicked a season-high four field goals against the Jacksonville Jaguars. He finished his first season with the Vikings going 15-15 on field goals and 11-14 on extra point attempts.

On October 9, 2017, Forbath kicked two field goals, including the game-winner against the Chicago Bears. In Week 7 of the 2017 season, Forbath converted six field goals, including a 52-yarder, in a 24–16 win over the Ravens, earning him NFC Special Teams Player of the Week. He is one of three Vikings' kickers to kick six field goals in a game; the last time this happened was in 1998 (Gary Anderson). On October 29, Forbath kicked four field goals against the Cleveland Browns. On January 14, 2018, Forbath kicked three field goals against the New Orleans Saints in the NFC Divisional Round.

On March 20, 2018, Forbath re-signed with the Vikings. However, the team traded up to draft Auburn kicker Daniel Carlson the next month. On August 20, 2018, Forbath was released by the Vikings after losing the starting job to the rookie Carlson.

Jacksonville Jaguars
On December 14, 2018, Forbath was signed by the Jacksonville Jaguars as insurance for the injured Josh Lambo. He was released on February 19, 2019 after playing three games for the Jaguars, making four out of his five field goal attempts.

New England Patriots
On November 29, 2019, the New England Patriots signed Forbath after the team released Nick Folk, who had undergone an emergency appendectomy. Forbath became the fourth placekicker on the Patriots' active roster in the 2019 season, after longtime kicker Stephen Gostkowski was placed on injured reserve after Week 4, original replacement Mike Nugent was released after four games, and Folk.  He made his Patriots debut on December 1, 2019 in a Week 13 matchup against the Houston Texans handling only field goals and extra points (punter Jake Bailey handled kick-off duties) and went 1-for-2 on extra points and made a 23-yard field goal in a 28–22 loss. The Patriots waived Forbath the day after the game.

Dallas Cowboys (second stint)
On December 9, 2019, Forbath was signed by the Dallas Cowboys after the team released Brett Maher. He helped to stabilize the placekicker position and didn't miss a kick for the rest of the season, making 10-of-10 field goals and 10-of-10 extra points.

On March 24, 2020, Forbath re-signed with the Cowboys. He was released on August 1, 2020, without having a chance to compete for the kicking job against Greg Zuerlein.

Carolina Panthers
On September 19, 2020, Forbath was signed to the Carolina Panthers practice squad, and was released on September 21, 2020. He was re-signed to the practice squad on September 25 and released again on September 28.

Chicago Bears
On October 9, 2020, Forbath was signed to the Chicago Bears practice squad.

Los Angeles Rams 
On October 20, 2020, Forbath was signed by the Los Angeles Rams off the Bears practice squad. He suffered an ankle injury in Week 10 and was placed on injured reserve on November 17, 2020.  He was then released from injured reserve after the Rams signed kicker Matt Gay off the Colts practice squad.

NFL career statistics

References

External links
Jacksonville Jaguars bio
Minnesota Vikings bio
Washington Redskins bio
UCLA Bruins football bio

1987 births
Living people
All-American college football players
American football placekickers
Dallas Cowboys players
New Orleans Saints players
Players of American football from Santa Monica, California
Tampa Bay Buccaneers players
UCLA Bruins football players
Washington Redskins players
Minnesota Vikings players
Jacksonville Jaguars players
New England Patriots players
Carolina Panthers players
Chicago Bears players
Los Angeles Rams players